Benu may refer to:

People
 Benu Dasgupta (1928–2010), Indian cricket player
 Benu Gopal Bangur (born 1931), Indian businessman
 Benu Malla (8th century), 3rd king of the Bagdi Malla dynasty of Bishnupur
 Benu Sen (1932–2011), Indian photographer

Other
 Benu (restaurant)

See also
 Bennu, an ancient Egyptian deity
 Benow (disambiguation)